Pityeja is a Neotropical moth genus in the family Geometridae erected by Francis Walker in 1861.

Pityeja have relatively conspicuous wing patterns, which probably led to overestimation of their species richness in the past.

Species
 Pityeja histrionaria (Herrich-Schäffer, 1853)
 Pityeja nazada (Druce, 1892)

References

External links

Ourapterygini